Bathnaha  is a village development committee in Mahottari District in the Janakpur Zone of south-eastern Nepal. At the time of the 1991 Nepal census it had a population of 7210 people living in 1206 individual households.

References

Total Population - 10000
No of Voters - 3500
Employment (Govt) - 100
Employment (Pvt) - 700
Employment (Self) - 1000
Agriculture Land - 7150 acers
School - Sri Bhai. Gu. Lo. Janta Ma. Bidyalaya, Esdtd - 2011
Access Road - From Jaleshwor, Sursand (Bihar), Parihar (Bihar), Sahashram, Kataiya, Madhawa, Halkhori, Barahi

External links
UN map of the municipalities of Mahottari District

Populated places in Mahottari District